Bilsk is a village in Poltava Raion, Poltava Oblast, Ukraine.

Bilsk (Belsk) is better known for its archaeological landmark Bilske Horodyshche (Bilsk Hill Fort), propounded by some Ukrainian archaeologists as the location of Gelonus, the principal city of the tribe of the Budini.

References

Zenkovsky Uyezd

Villages in Poltava Raion